Nam District (Nam-gu, 남구) is the southern district of Gwangju (광주광역시), South Korea.
'Nam'(南) means 'south' in Korean hanja. 'gu'(區) means 'district' of metropolitan city in Korean hanja.

Subdivisions 
There are 43 dongs, or neighborhoods, in Namgu, 남구.  
The dongs are:

 사동 Sa dong
 구동 Gu dong
 서동 Seo dong
 월산동 Wolsan dong (plus 4 and 5)
 월산4동
 월산5동
 백운동 Baekun dong (plus 1 and 2)
 백운1동
 백운2동
 주월동 Juwol dong (plus 1 and 2)
 주월1동
 주월2동
 노대동 Nodae dong
 진월동 Jinwol dong
 덕남동 Deoknam dong
 행암동 Haengam dong
 임암동 Imam dong
 송하동 Songha dong
 양림동 Yangrim dong
 방림동 Bangrim dong (plus 1 and 2)
 방림1동
 방림2동
 봉선동 Bongseon dong (plus 1 and 2)
 Bongseon-dong, also known as the richest neighborhood and the most expensive area in Gwangju, is in the south of the city. According to the 2020 census, it has a population of 43,735. South Korea is known for its heated competition for university entrance and Bongseon-dong is known for having a lot of schools and having the most tutoring centers in all of Honam, which makes it a very desirable place for people that have children in the city
 봉선1동
 봉선2동
 구소동 Guso dong
 양촌동 Yangchon dong
 도금동 Dogeum dong
 승촌동 SungChon dong
 지석동 Jiseok dong
 압촌동 Apchon dong
 화장동 Hwajang dong
 칠석동 Chilseok dong
 석정동 SeokJeong dong
 신장동 Shinjang dong
 양과동 YangGwa dong
 이장동 Ijeong dong
 대지동 Daeji dong
 월성동 Wolseong dong
 사직동 Sajik dong
 효덕동 Hyodeok dong
 송암동 Songam dong
 대촌동 Daechon dong

References

External links
Namgu homepage